Francisco de Santiago y Calderón (born 1669 in Torralba de Calatrava) was a Spanish clergyman and bishop for the Roman Catholic Archdiocese of Antequera, Oaxaca. He was ordained in 1729. He was appointed bishop in 1730. He died in 1736.

References 

1669 births
1736 deaths
Spanish Roman Catholic bishops